Tuusniemi is a municipality of Finland. The population density is 

Neighbour municipalities are Heinävesi, Juankoski, Kaavi, Kuopio, Leppävirta and Outokumpu.

The municipality is unilingually Finnish.

Notable people
 Olli Miettinen (1869–1946) –  politician
 Väinö Ikonen (1895–1954) – Greco-Roman wrestler and Olympian
 Antti Rissanen (born 1931) – sport shooter and Olympian
 Tuula Haatainen (born 1960) – politician
 Elisa Holopainen (born 2001) – ice hockey player and Olympic bronze medalist

References

External links

Municipality of Tuusniemi – Official website 

Municipalities of North Savo
Populated places established in 1870
1870 establishments in the Russian Empire